, often abbreviated as , is a Japanese four-panel manga series written and illustrated by Koi. The series has been serialized in Hōbunsha's Manga Time Kirara Max magazine since March 2011 and the chapters collected into eleven tankōbon volumes as of February 2023. An anime television series adaptation animated by White Fox aired in Japan between April and June 2014. A second season by White Fox and Kinema Citrus aired in Japan between October and December 2015. Two OVA films animated by production doA were released in November 2017 and September 2019. A third anime season by Encourage Films aired in Japan between October and December 2020.

Plot
In a small Continental European styled town in Japan, teenage Cocoa Hoto enters the cafe Rabbit House, assuming there are rabbits to be cuddled. What Cocoa actually finds is her high school boarding house, staffed by the owner's daughter, Chino Kafū, a small, precocious, and somewhat shy girl with an angora rabbit on top of her head. She quickly befriends Chino with the full intention of becoming like her older sister, much to Chino's annoyance. From there she will experience her new life and befriend many others, including the military-influenced, yet feminine Rize Tedeza, the playful Chiya Ujimatsu who goes at her own pace, and the impoverished Syaro Kirima who commands an air of nobility and admiration despite her background. Slowly, through slices of life, often comedic, Cocoa becomes irreplaceable in her new friends' lives, with Chino at the forefront.

Characters
Main characters are named after drinks.

Main characters 

A 15 (first year; 16 second year; 17-18 third year of high school) year old girl with orange mid-long hair, purple eyes and a cherry blossom hair accessory. She is a bubbly optimistic girl who claims to be able to make friends in 3 seconds, albeit she is often careless and has no sense of direction. She moved into the town to study at a high school, and stays in the Kafū residence; she began helping out at the Rabbit House to pay for her accommodation. Although she cannot distinguish the taste of coffee, she is able to work as a waitress. Cocoa is the youngest of four siblings and admires her older sister Mocha, who gave her a hair accessory (in which she has the other half). She treats Chino like a little sister so that Chino has an older sister figure to look up to, just as Cocoa does Mocha. Due to all of the people she's met in her life, Cocoa dreams of becoming an international barista lawyer with her own bakery, and even wants to be a novelist-part time (not to mention her younger self wanted to be a magician). She is named after .

A 13 (second year; 14 third year of middle school; 15 first year of high school) year old girl with long and straight blue hair, blue eyes, and two hair accessories on two sides in the shape of a cross. She is the granddaughter of the Rabbit House's founder. She is a quiet and soft-spoken girl and slowly warms up to Cocoa. She finds it challenging to be less polite and more casual due to her growing up with mostly older people. Along with her father, she is one of the only people who knows about the secret concerning Tippy and her grandfather. Her late mother created the Rabbit House's outfits because she one day wanted Chino to work there with her friends when she grew up. Cocoa coming into her life had a significant impact on her, leading to her adopting a more outgoing demeanor. She is named after .

A 16 (second year; 17 third year of high school; 18 first year of college) year old girl with purple hair that she often makes into bunches. A part-timer at the Rabbit House, she is the daughter of a wealthy former soldier, and thus likes army-related things and has a very disciplined, military-like personality, even going so far as to carry a model Glock and a combat knife. Despite this, she is still very kind and feminine. She excels in both academics and sport that she can provide help to different clubs. She is in the same school as Syaro and is her upperclassman. She is named after .

Syaro's old friend and neighbor, Cocoa's classmate and friend at high school. Her family runs a coffee shop named , complete with a rabbit mascot named Anko. Her grandmother was once the main business rival of Chino's grandfather, but both granddaughters do not intend to continue that rivalry. She is rather playful at times, often in a nonchalant manner. She is physically weak, and any tedious physical activity tires her out. She is very good at dodging things, however. She hopes to work with Syaro despite being hurt when Syaro once said she didn't intend to work in Ama Usa An. She is named after .

Chiya's childhood friend who lives next door to the Ama Usa An. She attends the same school as Rize as a scholarship student, but is poor. Syaro learned to be elegant due to her status as a scholarship student despite being from a poor background. She learned to fit in by staying up to date on fashion and faking smiles. She dramatically admires Rize as a person and as her upperclassman and has a crush on her. She has a wild grey rabbit named . Syaro reluctantly allowed the rabbit to stay in her house under the condition that it finds its own food. She is very hardworking and performs well in academics as she wants to get out of poverty. She is named after .

Chino's classmate and friend in middle school. She's very energetic and tomboyish, claiming she will only stay put when she is dead. Maya also harbors admiration for Rize, partly due to her military-like attitude. Despite her behavior and attitude, she does surprisingly well academically. She is named after  tea.

Her mother is a ballet teacher, so Megu is trained in ballet. Mature, honest, feminine, and trusting, she is rather pure and unable to detect when someone lies to her. She can guess what Maya is thinking by looking into her eyes. She is named after  tea.

Rabbit House 
Cocoa Hoto

Chino Kafu

Rize Tedeza

A female angora rabbit and the Rabbit House's mascot. She typically sits atop Chino's head while inside the Rabbit House. When not around Cocoa and the others, she speaks in a manly voice and helps Chino's father out at the bar. It is later revealed that through some unknown circumstances (though it is implied Cocoa was somehow involved), Tippy is possessed by the spirit of Chino's grandfather, the former owner of Rabbit House. Tippy would often speak in front of others, with Chino passing the voice off as her ventriloquism. Named after  tea.

Chino's father, who runs the bar during the night alongside Tippy. He is a friend of Rize's father, as the two of them were former soldiers. He allows Cocoa to stay in his house, as well as Mocha, during their employment at Rabbit House. He is the current owner of Rabbit House, which he runs more successfully than Chino's grandfather, to Tippy's irritation.

Deceased/dead. She had long and straight silver hair and blue eyes, and was Chino's late mother and Takahiro's late wife. She is a friend of Cocoa's mother during high school, and the creator of the Rabbit House's uniform. Named after .
Midori Aoyama

Ama Usa An (甘兎庵) 
Chiya Ujimatsu

Owner of Ama Usa An; she used to have a hostile relationship with Chino's grandpa and, despite their alleged rivalry, she did not take him seriously.

Fleur de Lapin 
Syaro Kirima

Bright Bunny 

One of the twins that Megu and Maya encountered in the train. Megu's classmate and friend in high school. Named after  tea and  tea.

Long blonde hair with red eyes. One of the twins that Megu and Maya encountered in the train. Maya's classmate and friend in high school. Named after .

A girl with short hair and dark blue eyes who is good at both ventriloquism and chess. Chino's classmate and friend in high school. Named after .

Other town residents 

She admired Chino's grandfather (who she affectionately calls ) and always asked his opinion about her stories. She briefly stopped writing books after she lost a pen that was given to her by Chino's grandfather. Chino gave her a temporary job in the Rabbit House, which she would still occasionally work at after finding her pen. She is a high school graduate of Rize and Syaro's private school. Named after .

Midori's friend and editor. She is a high school graduate of Rize and Syaro. Named after .

Rize's father. Takahiro's old friend and comrade from their years in the military. He has an eyepatch over his left eye, possibly due to a war injury.

A ballet teacher who owns/runs a dancing school and discovered the potential of Rize and Syaro and attempted to convince them to be her students. Like Midori, she is a graduate of the same school that Rize and Syaro attend and wants her own daughter to attend the same school.

Classmates

Rize and Syaro's high school 

Rize's classmate and old friend and former chairmen of the Blowgun Club who is studying at the same university as Rize, whom she previously worked for as a maid. Named after  tea.

Cocoa and Chiya's high school 

Cocoa and Chiya's class president in the second year. Chiya's classmate in the third year.

Cocoa and Chiya's classmate in the second year. Cocoa's classmate in the third year.

Cocoa and Chiya's classmate in the second year. Cocoa's classmate in the third year.

Cocoa and Chiya's classmate in the second year. Chiya's classmate in the third year. Named after .

Cocoa and Chiya's classmate in the second year. Chiya's classmate in the third year. Named after .

Cocoa and Chiya's classmate in the second year.

Cocoa and Chiya's classmate in the second year. Named after .

Hot Bakery 
Cocoa Hoto

Cocoa's older sister. She is very similar to Cocoa, besides the fact that Mocha is known for being a far more dependable older sister, and for being very good at cuddling people. She dotes on Cocoa and become depressed if Cocoa ignores her. Named after .

Cocoa's mother. High school classmate of Chino's mother (revealed on the final episode of Is the Order a Rabbit? BLOOM). Named after .

City Residents 

Works in the city as a professor at a university.
 and 

Cocoa's elder brothers and Mocha's younger brothers. They are working in the city to be a lawyer and scientist, respectively. Named after .

Chiya's mother who travels around as a buyer. Named after .

She runs a pottery workshop with her husband.

Books and publications

Manga

Complete Blend Manga

Art Book

TV Anime Official Guide Book

Comics anthology

Anime television series

Overview 
An anime television series adaptation animated by White Fox aired in Japan between April 10 and June 26, 2014, and simulcast by Crunchyroll. Sentai Filmworks licensed the series for the North America market, while Muse Communication licensed the series for Southeast Asia and South Asia market.

A second season titled Is the Order a Rabbit?? animated by White Fox and Kinema Citrus was announced in the March 2015 issue of Gakken's Megami Magazine, and aired in Japan between October 10 and December 26, 2015.

An OVA film, Is the Order a Rabbit?? ~Dear My Sister~, was announced in May 2016, and animated by production doA. The film was screened in 40 movie theaters across Japan on November 11, 2017, and later released on home video on May 30, 2018.

A second OVA, Is the Order a Rabbit?? ~Sing For You~, was released on September 26, 2019. The OVA features the return of scriptwriter Kazuyuki Fudeyasu, director Hiroyuki Hashimoto, and animation studio production doA.

A third season titled Is the Order a Rabbit? BLOOM animated by Encourage Films aired in Japan between October 10 and December 26, 2020, with the cast and staff reprising their roles. For episode 12, the ending theme is "Yume<Utsutsu→Happy time"(ユメ＜ウツツ→ハッピータイム) by Petit Rabbit's. The third season ran for 12 episodes.

Appearances in other media 
Characters and songs from Is the Order a Rabbit? appear alongside other anime characters in the rhythm game, Miracle Girls Festival, developed by Sega for the PlayStation Vita on December 17, 2015. A visual novel developed by 5pb., titled , was released for the PlayStation Vita in Japan on March 3, 2016. Characters from Is the Order a Rabbit? appeared in collaboration with Ameba's mobile game Girl Friend Beta in 2017. Characters in the series also appeared in the mobile game Kirara Fantasia in 2018.

References

External links

 

2011 manga
2014 anime television series debuts
2015 anime television series debuts
2020 anime television series debuts
Animated television series about rabbits and hares
Anime series based on manga
Comedy anime and manga
Encourage Films
Houbunsha manga
Kinema Citrus
NBCUniversal Entertainment Japan
Seinen manga
Sentai Filmworks
Slice of life anime and manga
Television series set in restaurants
Tokyo MX original programming
White Fox
Yonkoma
Muse Communication